Thomas Love may refer to:

 Thomas C. Love (1789–1853), U.S. Representative from New York
 Thomas Alfred Love (1883–1955), Canadian politician
 Thomas George Love (1793–1845), British agent and bookkeeper
 Tom Love (born 1937), American billionaire businessman